New Year's Gift or Villa de Speranza is a property located in Glenwood in Howard County, Maryland, United States.

The property consists of a log cabin built in 1730, and a larger building with a cornerstone date of 1788. The L shaped house is built of brick construction with stucco covering. A two-story open porch supported by six columns flanks the front of the house. A two-story connection leads to a kitchen addition. The house was once owned by Dennis P. Gaither and later his son Daniel.  In the late 1970s the property was subdivided to 9.9 acres.

See also
List of Howard County properties in the Maryland Historical Trust

References

Houses in Howard County, Maryland
Glenwood, Howard County, Maryland
1738 establishments in Maryland
Houses completed in 1730
Houses completed in 1788